GCM Grosvenor is an American alternative asset management firm, with over $73 billion in assets under management and approximately 500 professionals as of 2022.

GCM Grosvenor manages assets on behalf of a global client base across hedge fund strategies, private equity, real estate, infrastructure, and multi-asset class investments. The firm specializes in developing customized portfolios for clients who want an active role in their alternatives programs; it also provides multi-client portfolios for investors. Investment offerings include direct and co-investments, secondaries, and multi-manager portfolios. GCM Grosvenor's clients are mostly institutions, such as pension funds, sovereign wealth entities, financial institutions, corporations, insurance companies, charitable organizations, and endowments.

GCM Grosvenor has more than $15 billion invested and committed to Environmental, Social and Governance (ESG) themes, and as a signatory to the Principles for Responsible Investment (PRI), GCM Grosvenor received an A+ rating from the PRI in 2020 for its overarching approach to ESG strategy and governance and an A+ rating for ESG integration in manager selection, approval, and monitoring.

GCM Grosvenor has invested/committed over $20 billion with small, early-stage, diverse, and women alternative investment managers since 1989. The firm hosts two industry events – Consortium and the Small and Emerging Managers (SEM) Conference – designed to facilitate connections between managers and investors.

Awards
In 2019, GCM Grosvenor received the Civic Federation’s Addams-Palmer Award from for exemplary civic involvement by a Chicago institution.

History
GCM Grosvenor was founded in 1971 by Richard Elden and managed the first fund of hedge funds in the United States. In 1973, Elden brought on a partner, Frank Meyer, who had been a colleague at A.G. Becker. Elden left GCM Grosvenor in 2006 to start Lakeview Investment Manager, which runs an activist fund of hedge funds, and Meyer retired from the business. Michael Sacks, who joined the firm in 1990, is the current Chairman and chief executive officer of the company.

In January 2014, GCM Grosvenor completed its acquisition of the Customized Fund Investment Group (CFIG) from Credit Suisse Group AG. CFIG was Credit Suisse's third-party private equity business, investing some $20 billion with outside private equity managers.

In August 2020, GCM Grosvenor announced it will become a public company through a merger with CF Finance Acquisition Corp. (“CFAC”) (NASDAQ: CFFA), a special purpose acquisition company sponsored by Cantor Fitzgerald, a leading global financial services firm. GCM Grosvenor began trading on The Nasdaq Capital Market under the ticker “GCMG” on November 18, 2020.

References

Hedge fund firms in Chicago
Investment management companies of the United States
Financial services companies established in 1971
Alternative investment management companies
American companies established in 1971
1971 establishments in Illinois